Ala Ela is a 2014 Indian Telugu-language film directed by Anish R. Krishna and produced by Ashok Vardhan. The film stars Rahul Ravindran, Hebah Patel, Kushi, Bhanu Sri Mehra, Vennela Kishore, and Shani Salmon. The music was composed by Bheems Ceciroleo with cinematography by Sai Sri Ram. The film was released on 28 November 2014.

Plot
Karthik (Rahul Ravindran) is forced to fulfill the last wish of his grandfather: marry a village girl named Divya (Kushi). Karthik wants to get introduced to her in anonymity and then fall in love before getting married. He gathers his funky friends - a victim of wife (Vennela Kishore) and a guy (Shani Salmon) who thinks he is creative. After going to the village, Karthik meets Shruti (Hebah Patel) and then Divya. The rest of the story is all about what happens when Karthik realises that he has feelings for Shruti instead of Divya.

Cast

Rahul Ravindran as Karthik
Hebah Patel as Shruti
Kushi as Divya
Bhanu Sri Mehra
Vennela Kishore
Shani Salmon
Kondavalasa
Krishna Bhagawan
Ravi Varma

Soundtrack

The soundtrack of the film was composed by Bheems Ceciroleo. The soundtrack album was released on 29 July 2014 at 7 Acres, Annapurna Studios Hyderabad and its consists of six songs. Lyrics for the songs were written by Sirivennela Seetharama Sastry, Vanamali and Bheems Ceciroleo.

References

External links

2010s Telugu-language films
Films scored by Bheems Ceciroleo